Hadid (also Romanized as Ḩadīd and Ḩedeyd; also known as Hamayat and Ḩemāyat) is a village in Jarahi Rural District, in the Central District of Mahshahr County, Khuzestan Province, Iran. At the 2006 census, its population was 159, in 33 families.

References 

Populated places in Mahshahr County